Android store may refer to:

Android Market, Google's "app store" for Android
Androidland, a retail store by the carrier Telstra